Dan Heimer Ekner (5 February 1927 – 17 April 1975) was a Swedish footballer who played as a striker. He played professionally in England, France, Italy, Spain, Germany, the United States, and the Netherlands during a club career that spanned between 1945 and 1963.

Club career 
Ekner was the first Swedish player to play in the Football League when he played five games for Portsmouth during the 1949–50 season during which Portsmouth ended up winning the league title. While at Atletico Madrid, he was part of the team that reached the 1956 Copa del Rey final. He also represented clubs in Italy, the Netherlands, Germany, and the United States during his career.

International career 
Ekner appeared once for the Sweden B team in 1949.

Honours 
Portsmouth

 Football League First Division: 1949–50

References

General
Profile

Specific

1927 births
1975 deaths
Swedish footballers
Örgryte IS players
IFK Göteborg players
Portsmouth F.C. players
Ligue 1 players
Olympique de Marseille players
ACF Fiorentina players
S.P.A.L. players
Serie A players
Atlético Madrid footballers
Rot-Weiss Essen players
PSV Eindhoven players
Swedish expatriate footballers
Expatriate footballers in England
Expatriate footballers in France
Expatriate footballers in Italy
Expatriate soccer players in the United States
Expatriate footballers in Spain
Expatriate footballers in Germany
Expatriate footballers in the Netherlands
IS Halmia players
Association football forwards
English Football League players
La Liga players
Footballers from Gothenburg